Eupithecia mitigata is a moth in the family Geometridae. It is found in Afghanistan, Tajikistan, Kyrgyzstan, southern Kazakhstan, north-western China (Xinjiang) and Kashmir.

Adults are unicolorous dark grey.

References

Moths described in 1906
mitigata
Moths of Asia